Hot R&B/Hip-Hop Songs is a chart published by Billboard that ranks the top-performing songs in the United States in African-American-oriented musical genres; the chart has undergone various name changes since its launch in 1942 to reflect the evolution of such genres.  In 1975, it was published under the title Hot Soul Singles.  During that year, 43 different singles topped the chart, based on playlists submitted by radio stations and surveys of retail sales outlets.

The rapid turnover of number ones during the year meant that 1975 had the highest number of chart-topping singles in a calendar year since Billboard launched a combined sales and airplay chart for black music in 1958.  Only eight singles spent more than one week at number one, including one which spent two weeks in the top spot but non-consecutively.  The year's longest-running number one was "Fight the Power (Part 1)" by the Isley Brothers, which spent three consecutive weeks atop the chart in July and August.  The Ohio Players spent the highest total number of weeks at number one of any act, with four weeks in the peak position.  The group was the only act to achieve three number ones during the year; Al Green, KC & the Sunshine Band, the O'Jays, the Temptations and Barry White each took two singles to number one.

Ten of 1975's soul number ones also topped the all-genre Hot 100 listing.  "Kung Fu Fighting" by Carl Douglas had already topped the Hot 100 in late 1974, and reached the top of the soul chart in January 1975.  Labelle, Earth, Wind & Fire, Van McCoy & the Soul City Symphony, Silver Convention and the Staple Singers each took a single to the top of both charts during 1975.  The Ohio Players topped both charts during 1975 with "Fire", and their single "Love Rollercoaster", which was the final soul number one of 1975, would go on top the Hot 100 in early 1976.  KC & the Sunshine Band also released two singles in 1975 which topped both charts, as both "Get Down Tonight" and "That's the Way (I Like It)".  The former song was the first soul number one for the group, which would go on to be one of the most successful in the disco genre before that style fell from favour at the end of the 1970s.  Several acts who would go on to experience long and successful chart careers topped the listing for the first time in 1975, including Kool & the Gang, the Pointer Sisters, and Earth, Wind & Fire.  Conversely, acts including Shirley & Company, Major Harris and New Birth gained the only number ones of their respective careers during the year and would achieve little further success in chart terms.

Chart history

See also
 List of Billboard Hot 100 number-one singles of 1975

References

1975
1975 record charts
1975 in American music